The men's 4x100 metres T11-13 relay competition of the athletics events at the 2015 Parapan American Games was held on August 14 at the CIBC Athletics Stadium.

Records
Prior to this competition, the existing records were as follows:

Schedule
All times are Central Standard Time (UTC-6).

Teams

Results
All times are shown in seconds.

Final

References

Athletics at the 2015 Parapan American Games